Kiki Bertens and Johanna Larsson were the defending champions, but Larsson chose not to participate. Bertens partnered Eva Hrdinová, but lost in the first round to Johanna Konta and Laura Thorpe.

Konta and Thorpe then won the title, defeating Jocelyn Rae and Anna Smith in the final, 1–6, 6–4, [10–5].

Seeds

Draw

References 
 Draw

Open GDF Suez de Cagnes-sur-Mer Alpes-Maritimes - Doubles